Margaret Godolphin (née Blagge; 2 August 1652 – 9 September 1678) was a British courtier. She chose John Evelyn as a mentor and died after childbirth. His account of her life was not published until 1847.

Life
Margaret Blagge was probably born in London on 2 August 1652 to Colonel Thomas Blagge and his wife. Her father who was a Royalist died in 1660.

In about 1666 she took on the role of Maid of Honour to Anne Hyde, the Duchess of York. When the duchess died in 1671 she was employed in the same role by the Queen.

She chose John Evelyn as a mentor and "spiritual father" in 1672. Margaret was twenty and Evelyn was 52 and he advised her on religious learning and worship. Evelyn would write a book about her life.

She married Sidney Godolphin on 16 May 1676, when she was a maid of court.  He would later become one of the most important politicians in England.

Godolphin gave birth to Francis Godolphin on 3 September 1678, and due to complications resulting from the birth, she died in Whitehall on 9 September.

Legacy
Godolphin was buried at Breage Parish Church in Cornwall some days later. An account of her life was written by John Evelyn and this was passed down through his family to Edward Venables-Vernon-Harcourt who was the Archbishop of York. He arranged for it to be published in 1847 with the assistance of the Bishop of Oxford.

References

1652 births
1678 deaths
British maids of honour
Deaths in childbirth
Court of Charles II of England